Phormis (fl. c. 478 BC) is one of the originators of Greek comedy, or of a particular form of it. Aristotle identified him as one of the originators of comedy, along with Epicharmus of Kos. He was said to be the first to introduce actors with robes reaching to the ankles, and to ornament the stage with skins dyed purple—as drapery it may be presumed.

Surviving Titles and Fragments
The Suda gave a list of his comedies:

 Admetus
 Alcinous
 Alcyone
 Atalante
 Cepheus (or Kephalaia)
 Hippos ("The Horse")
 Iliou Porthesis ("The Sacking of Troy")
 Perseus

References
 Aristotle, Poetics, c. 5
 Pausanias, Description of Greece 
 The Suda Lexicon, ll. cc  
 Athenaeus, Deipnosophistae, xiv. p. 652, a
 Fabricius, Johann Albert Bibl. Graec. vol. ii. p. 315
 

Ancient Greek dramatists and playwrights
Old Comic poets
5th-century BC Athenians